The 1968 Sutton Council election took place on 9 May 1968 to elect members of Sutton London Borough Council in London, England. The whole council was up for election and the Conservative party stayed in overall control of the council.

Background
A total of 127 candidates, down from 157 in 1964 stood in the election for the 51 seats being contested across 25 wards. These included a full slate from the Conservative parties, while Labour stood 48 candidates, the Liberals stood 16 candidates, the Residents Association stood 10 candidates, and the Communist party stood 2 candidates. There were 24 two-seat wards and 1 three-seat ward.

Election result

|}

Ward results

(Residents and Ratepayers)

(Residents and Ratepayers)

(Residents and Ratepayers)

(Residents and Ratepayers)

(Residents and Ratepayers)

References

1968 London Borough council elections